This is a list of pre-season tournaments Major League Soccer clubs have been participants.

Multi-team tournaments
 Yearly
 Carolina Challenge Cup
 Mobile Mini Sun Cup

Infrequently
 La Manga Cup
 Portland Timbers Tournament
One time event (so far)
 Texas Pro Soccer Festival 2008
 Orlando City Invitational

Defunct
Sounders Community Shield
Hawaiian Islands Invitational
Walt Disney World Pro Soccer Classic

Preseason cups
 Lamar Hunt Pioneer Cup
 Saturn Cup

Sources 

Major League Soccer